Rachel (Johnson) Tomajczyk (born April 30, 1993) is an American distance running athlete.

High school
Rachel ran for the Plano Senior High School cross country and track team in Plano, Texas. She trained with the Dallas Metroplex Striders club team. Rachel won the 2010 Nike Cross Nationals Cross Country meet. She is a two-time Foot Locker Cross Country Championships finalist, finishing as runner-up in 2010 and 11th overall in 2009. Rachel claimed the University Interscholastic League Texas Class 5A state championships individual state cross country title in 2010 after earning a runner-up finish in 2009. Rachel was named 2010 Gatorade Player of the Year awards Texas Cross Country Runner. Rachel earned Texas 5A track state titles in 1600 meters and 3200 meters. She finished second at the Texas state meet in 1600 meters in 2009. Rachel had high school personal bests of 4:53.75 at 1600 meters and 17:10 at 5000 meters.

NCAA College
Rachel Johnson is a six time NCAA Division I All-American, and a fourteen time All- Big 12 Conference while running as an athlete at Baylor University. While competing at Baylor, she set  Baylor track records for the 3 km indoor, 5 km indoor, 3 km steeplechase outdoor, 5 km outdoor, and the 10 km outdoor. She was a silver medalist at the 2015 NCAA Indoor Championships in the 5,000 meters.

After college
After graduation from Baylor University, Rachel Johnson joined ASICS Furman Elite, an elite post-collegiate distance program under Coach Robert Gary based out of Greenville, South Carolina, in September 2016. In September 2018, she moved to Flagstaff, Arizona, where Ryan Hall began coaching her. In July 2019, Rachel moved to Lynchburg, Virginia, and began to coach distance athletes at Liberty University. She married Drew Tomajczyk in June 2021.

NACAC Track and Field Championships

USA National Championships

Mountain

Road

Track and Field

References

External links
 
 

Living people
1993 births
Track and field athletes from Dallas
American female long-distance runners
Baylor Bears women's track and field athletes
American female middle-distance runners
American female steeplechase runners
Sportspeople from Texas
21st-century American women